Galvano is a masculine Italian given name from Latin Galbanus and Galba. 

It may refer to:

Galvano da Levanto (d. c. 1312), Genoese physician
Galvano Fiamma (1283–1344), Milanese chronicler
Galvano Becchini (fl. 1361–1382), Italian theologian
Galvano Della Volpe (1895–1968), Italian philosopher

See also
 Galvão (Portuguese) and Galvan (Spanish)
 Galvani